Dalgach is a village in Northern Bulgaria. The village is located in Targovishte Municipality, Targovishte Province. Аccording to the numbers provided by the 2020 Bulgarian census, Dalgach currently has a population of 484 people with a permanent address registered in the settlement.

Geography 
Dalgach village is located in Municipality Targovishte. It is located 14 kilometers east of Targovishte.

The elevation of the village ranges between 100 and 199 meters with an average elevation of 174 meters above sea level. The village's climate is continental. There is a river called Dalgach dere which passes near the village.

In the village's area, the geographical area "Idirizova Koriya" can be found. Idirizova Koriya is a group of centenarian trees with an average age of more than 150 years. Some of the trees are over 300 years old.

History 
The are archeological sites near the village, located 1 kilometers southeast from Dalgach. The site is located on the right bank of Dalgach Dere river.

There is a settlement historical mound which can be found there with a large size of diameter over 50 meters and 70 meters in height.

Buildings and infrastructure 
In 2016, the village won the competition of Targovishte Municipality regarding the best Christmas decoration.

 The local community hall and library "Saglasie" is still acting
 There is a Kindergarten "Nezabravka"  in Dalgach village.

Ethnicity 
According to the Bulgarian population census in 2011.

References 

Villages in Targovishte Province